Arsène is a masculine French given name. It is derived from the Latin name Arsenius, the Latinized form of the Greek name Ἀρσἐνιος (Arsenios), which means "male, virile". It has also been used as a surname. It may refer to:

Given name

 Arsène Alancourt (1904–1965), French professional road bicycle racer 
 Arsène Alexandre (1859–1937), French art critic
 Arsène Auguste (1951–1993), Haitian footballer
 Arsène Copa (born 1988), Gabonese footballer
 Arsène Darmesteter (1846–1888), French philologist
 Arsène de Cey (1806–1887), French playwright and novelist
 Arsène Do Marcolino (born 1986), Gabonese footballer
 Arsène Heitz (1908–1989), French draughtsman, co-creator of the Flag of Europe
 Arsène Herbinier (1869-1955), French lithograph artist
 Arsène Houssaye (1815-1896), French novelist and poet
 Arsene James (born 1944), Saint Lucian politician
 Arsène Kra Konan (born 19??), Ivorian sprinter
 Arsène Menessou (born 1987), Beninese international footballer 
 Arsène Mersch (1913–1980), Luxembourger road bicycle racer
 Arsène Millocheau (1867-1948), French road bicycle racer
 Arsène Né (born 1981), Ivorian footballer
 Arsène Oka (born 1983), Ivorian footballer
 Arsène Piesset (1919–1987), French long-distance runner
 Arsène Pint (born 1933), Belgian pentathlete and Olympian
 Arsène Pujo (1861-1939), American politician
 Arsène Roux (1893—1971), French linguist, Arabist and Berberologist
 Arsène Trouvé (fl. 1800s), French painter
 Arsène Tsaty-Boungou, Congolese politician
 Arsène Marie Paul Vauthier (1885-1979), French Major General 
 Arsène Wenger (born 1949), French football manager

Fictional characters 
 Arsène Lupin is a fictional gentleman thief created by Maurice Leblanc.
 Arsène Lupin III is a fictional gentleman thief created by Monkey Punch and is the title character of the Lupin III franchise.
 Arsène, Joker's Persona in Persona 5

Surname
 Dean Arsene (born 1980), Canadian ice hockey defenceman
 Faed Arsène (born 1985), Malagasy football striker
 Hervé Arsène (born 1963), Malagasy football player and coach

See also
Arsenius (name)
Arsen
Arsenović

References

French masculine given names
Given names of Greek language origin